
Year 315 (CCCXV) was a common year starting on Saturday (link will display the full calendar) of the Julian calendar. At the time, it was known as the Year of the Consulship of Constantinus and Licinianus (or, less frequently, year 1068 Ab urbe condita). The denomination 315 for this year has been used since the early medieval period, when the Anno Domini calendar era became the prevalent method in Europe for naming years.

Events 
 By place 
 Roman Empire 
 Constantine the Great and co-emperor Licinius battle the Sarmates, the Goths and the Carpians along the Danube. Constantine leads a punitive expedition into Dacia and reestablishes the Roman fortifications of the frontier.
 July 25 – The Arch of Constantine is completed near the Colosseum at Rome to commemorate Constantine's victory over Maxentius at the Milvian Bridge. As part of the ceremony Constantine is expected to make a sacrifice to Rome's traditional gods, but he refuses to do so.
 Constantine I dedicates the Basilica of Maxentius and installs a large statue of himself inside it.
 Crucifixion is abolished as punishment in the Roman Empire.
 A program of assistance to the poor is established in the Roman Empire. 
 Immense baths are constructed in Augusta Treverorum (modern-day Trier).

 By topic 
 Religion 
 Eusebius becomes bishop of Caesarea (approximate date).
 The lamb becomes the symbol of Jesus in Christian art.

Births 
 Flavius Hannibalianus, ruler of Armenia and Pontus (d. 337)
 Hilary of Poitiers, Christian bishop and Doctor of the Church
 Himerius, Greek sophist and rhetorician (approximate date)
 Vettius Agorius Praetextatus, Roman politician (d. 384)

Deaths 

 September 14 – Maternus of Cologne, bishop of Trier
 Du Tao (or Jingwen), Chinese general and rebel leader
 Galeria Valeria, Roman empress and wife of Galerius
 Prisca, Roman empress and wife of Diocletian (b. 247)
 Valerius of Saragossa, Christian bishop and martyr

References